The men's 400 metres event at the 2011 Summer Universiade was held on 11–13 August.

Medalists

Results

Heats
Qualification: First 2 in each heat and 8 best performers advance to the Semifinals.

Semifinals

Qualification: First 2 of each semifinal (Q) and the next 2 fastest (q) qualified for the final.

Final

References 
Heats results
Semifinals results
Final results

400
2011